The Museum of Neon Art (MONA) is an institution that exists to encourage learning and curiosity through the preservation, collection, and interpretation of neon art. The first museum devoted to art that incorporates neon lighting, it exclusively exhibits art in electric media, including kinetic art and outstanding examples of historic neon signs. Its location in downtown LA closed in 2011 and reopened in Glendale, California in 2016.  The collection includes neon signs from the Brown Derby and Grauman's Chinese Theatre.

The museum was founded in 1981 by Lili Lakich and Richard Jenkins. For over 20 years Kim Koga was executive director, overseeing crucial moves of the institution and finding it a home in Glendale. In 2020 Corrie Siegel was appointed as executive director.

In addition to exhibitions and tours, the museum offers introductory classes in glass bending held in the museum's state-of-the-art studio.

References

External links

 Contributed photographs ("group pool") related to the museum.

Museums in Los Angeles County, California
Museum of Neon Art
Art museums and galleries in California
Art museums established in 1981
Museum of Neon Art
Museum of Neon Art